Mesembrine is an alkaloid present in Sceletium tortuosum (kanna). It has been shown to act as a serotonin reuptake inhibitor (Ki = 1.4 nM), and more recently, has also been found to behave as a weak inhibitor of the enzyme phosphodiesterase 4 (PDE4) (Ki = 7,800 nM). Still more recently, in an in vitro study published in 2015, scientist concluded that "a high-mesembrine Sceletium extract exerts its anti-depressant effect by acting primarily as monoamine releasing agent, rather than as selective serotonin-reuptake inhibitor." As such, mesembrine likely plays a dominant role in the antidepressant effects of kanna. The levorotatory isomer, (−)-mesembrine, is the natural form.

Rat studies have evaluated effects of kanna extract, finding analgesic and antidepressant potential.  No adverse results were noted for a commercial extract up to 5000 mg/kg daily in rats.

Mesembrine has also been identified in Mesembryanthemum cordifolium, Delosperma echinatum and Oscularia deltoides

Total synthesis
Mesembrine was first isolated and characterized by Bodendorf, et al. in 1957. It is a tricyclic molecule and has two bridgehead chiral carbons between the five-membered ring and the six-membered ring (highlighted in green in the figure below). Because of its structure and bioactivity, mesembrine has been a target for total synthesis over the past 40 years. Over 40 total syntheses have been reported for mesembrine, most of which focused on different approaches and strategies for the construction of the bicyclic ring system and the quaternary carbon.

The first total synthesis of mesembrine was reported by Shamma, et al. in 1965. This route has 21 steps, which was among the longest synthetic routes for mesembrine. Key steps involve the construction of the six-membered ketone ring by Diels-Alder reaction, α-allylation for synthesis of the quaternary carbon, and conjugate addition reaction for the final five-membered ring closure. The final product from this route is a racemic mixture of (+)- and (-)-mesembrine.

In 1971, Yamada, et al. reported the first asymmetric total synthesis of (+)-mesembrine. The quaternary carbon was introduced by asymmetric Robinson annulation reaction mediated by an L-proline derivative.

References

Antidepressants
Indole alkaloids
Ketones
Phenol ethers
PDE4 inhibitors
Serotonin reuptake inhibitors
Total synthesis